The grey go-away-bird (Corythaixoides concolor), also known as grey lourie, grey loerie, or kwêvoël, is a bold and common bird of the southern Afrotropics. They are present in arid to moist, open woodlands and thorn savanna, especially near surface water. They regularly form groups and parties that forage in tree tops, or dust bathe on the ground. Especially when disturbed, they make their presence known by their characteristically loud and nasal "kweh" or "go-way" calls, with the last syllable typically a descending drawl. Within range, their unique combination of appearance and habits precludes confusion with other bird species.

Habits
Though their flight is rather slow and laboured, they can cover long distances. Once in the open tree tops however, they can display the agility which is associated with the Musophagidae, as they run along tree limbs and jump from branch to branch. They can form groups and parties numbering even 20 to 30 that move about in search of fruit and insects near the tree tops.

Description
The sexes are similar. They measure 47–51 cm from bill tip to tail tip, and weigh some 200 to 300 g. They have an almost uniform smoky-grey plumage with long tails and (similar to mousebirds) a wispy, back-swept crest of some 6 to 7 cm in length. The crest can be raised almost vertically when excited. The strong, decurved beak is black and the gape and tongue strikingly pink. The plumage is darkest grey on the chin and throat, and palest around the eyes and on the belly. The breast plumage is washed slightly olive like that of its near relative, the bare-faced go-away-bird.

Diet 
Its diet is mainly fruit (such as wild figs and berries), flowers, buds, leaves, termites, and snails. 
Fruit are obtained from plants in the genera Ficus, Viscum, Loranthus, Diospyros, Lannea, Ziziphus, Salvadora and Flueggea, among others. They also feed on fruit of exotic invasives like seringa, and disperse their seeds.

Range and habitat 
It is native to southern Angola, southern DRC, Zambia, southern Tanzania, Malawi, Mozambique, Namibia, Botswana, Zimbabwe, South Africa and Eswatini. It occupies any arid to moist, and relatively open savanna woodlands, especially where Acacia trees are present. They frequent the edges of miombo woodland, and occur commonly along water courses, dry riparian forest and in Acacia woodland on alluvium. It also occurs commonly on farms and in suburban gardens and parks. They require water, and disperse along tributaries of desert rivers when water flows. It is absent from areas that lack suitable fruiting trees, and seems to desert areas where bush encroachment occurs. They have no regular migrations, but wander about irregularly in search of food and water.

Nesting
The flimsy nest platform is built from fairly thin, and often thorny sticks. It has the appearance of a substantial dove's nest, and their almost round, white eggs can be seen from below. Usually three eggs are laid in a nest that is placed at the center of an isolated tree. The adults share all parental duties, and the chicks start clambering about before they are able to fly. The chicks are covered in dense brownish down, and are fed regurgitated food by the parents. The breeding season is July to August in Angola, April to November in Malawi, August to September in Zambia, Sept and December to April in Namibia, and all months in Zimbabwe and South Africa.

Races

Four races are generally accepted, though more have been described: 
 C. c. molybdophanes (Clancey, 1964) – ne Angola to s Tanzania and n Mozambique
Description: Greyer chest plumage than bechuanae
 C. c. pallidiceps (Neumann, 1899) – w Angola, Namibia and w Botswana
 C. c. bechuanae (Roberts, 1932) – s Angola, ne Namibia, Botswana, s Zambia, c Zimbabwe and n South Africa
Description: Olive wash on chest plumage
 C. c. concolor (A. Smith, 1833) – s Malawi, w Mozambique to Eswatini and e South Africa
Description: Only faint olive wash on chest plumage, paler grey below than bechuanae

References

External links

 Grey Go-away-bird, sound recordings, xeno-canto
 Grey go-away-bird - Species text in The Atlas of Southern African Birds

grey go-away-bird
Birds of Southern Africa
Birds of Sub-Saharan Africa
grey go-away-bird
Taxa named by Andrew Smith (zoologist)